Cecil Booth (21 February 1896 – 13 June 1988) was an English cricketer. He played seven first-class matches for Cambridge University Cricket Club in 1923.

See also
 List of Cambridge University Cricket Club players

References

External links
 

1896 births
1988 deaths
English cricketers
Cambridge University cricketers
Sportspeople from Aylesbury